John William Clark Watson (February 27, 1808 – September 24, 1890) was an American politician who served as a Confederate States Senator from Mississippi from 1864 to 1865.

References

Sources

External links
John William Clark Watson at The Political Graveyard

1808 births
1890 deaths
19th-century American politicians
Confederate States of America senators
Mississippi state court judges
People from Albemarle County, Virginia
People of Mississippi in the American Civil War
19th-century American judges